Latu Fifita (born 29 October 1987) is a professional rugby league footballer of Indigenous Australian and Tongan descent who most recently played professionally for Workington Town in the Kingstone Press Championship.

Fifita is a Tongan international. He is a Balmain Tigers junior and has previously played for the North Sydney Bears and the Northern Pride.

Latu Fifita is the elder brother of twins Andrew Fifita and David Fifita.

References

External links
Workington Town profile

1987 births
Living people
Latu
Rugby league props
Tonga national rugby league team players
Tongan rugby league players
Tongan sportspeople
Workington Town players